Last Dance is a 2012 Australian thriller film directed by David Pulbrook and starring Firass Dirani, Julia Blake, Alan Hopgood.

Plot
A Muslim man (Firass Dirani) kidnaps an elderly Melbourne Jewish woman (Julia Blake) and holds her hostage.

Production
The female lead was meant to be Gena Rowlands but her casting was opposed by the MEAA.

Release
The film had its international premiere at the 2012 Melbourne International Film Festival.

References

External links
 

2012 films
Australian thriller films
2012 thriller films
2010s English-language films
2010s Australian films